Aloria is a hamlet and concejo located in the municipality of Amurrio, in Álava province, Basque Country, Spain. As of 2020, it has a population of 24.

Geography 
Aloria is located 37 km northwest of Vitoria-Gasteiz.

References

Populated places in Álava